The European Champion Clubs' Cup, also known as Coupe des Clubs Champions Européens, or simply the European Cup, is a trophy awarded annually by UEFA to the football club that wins the UEFA Champions League. The competition in its older format shared its name with the trophy, being also known as the European Cup, before being renamed for the 1992–93 season onwards.

Several physical trophies have had the name, as a club was entitled to keep the cup after five wins or three consecutive wins, with a new cup having to be forged for the following season. During the first years of the competition, up until 1966–67 season, the trophy had a distinctively different design.

The trophy

The original European Cup trophy was donated by L'Équipe, a French sports newspaper. This trophy was awarded permanently to Real Madrid in March 1967. At the time, they were the reigning champions, and had won six titles altogether, including the first five competitions from 1956 to 1960. Celtic therefore became the first club to win the cup in its current design in 1967.

The replacement trophy, with a somewhat different design from the original, was commissioned by UEFA from Jörg Stadelmann, a jeweller from Bern, Switzerland. At a cost of 10,000 Swiss francs, it was silver, 74 cm high, weighing 11 kg. Subsequent replacement trophies have replicated this design. The shape of the handles have earned it the nickname of "big ears" in multiple languages, including French ("la Coupe aux grandes oreilles"), Italian ("La Coppa dalle grandi orecchie"), Spanish ("La Orejona"), Russian ("Ушастый"), Vietnamese ("Cúp tai voi") and Chinese ("大耳朵杯"). Between 1967 and 1994, the trophy bears the title "Coupe des Clubs Champions Européens" in sentence case. Milan were the last team to win this type of trophy. Since then, the trophy bears the title fully in capital letters, albeit the size is increased in the subsequent and current trophy.

The trophy that currently is awarded is the sixth and has been in use since 2006, after Liverpool won their fifth European Cup in 2005. Since 2009, Champions League winners have not kept the real trophy, which remains in UEFA's custody at all times. A full-size replica trophy, the Champions League winners trophy, is awarded to the winning club with their name engraved on it. Winning clubs are permitted to make replicas of their own. They must be clearly marked as such and can be a maximum of eighty percent the size of the actual trophy.

The previous rule introduced before the 1968–69 season, allowed a club to keep the trophy after five wins or three consecutive wins.  At that point, Real Madrid was the only club meeting either qualification and indeed met both. Once a club had been awarded the trophy, the count was reset to zero. For example, a club with no prior titles which won six titles in a row would have been permanently awarded trophies after the third and sixth wins (each for three-in-a-row) but not after their fifth win. A club whose Champions League title win was not a fifth overall or third consecutive previously kept the real trophy for ten months after their victory and received a scaled-down replica to keep permanently.

Clubs awarded the trophy permanently

Five clubs have kept the real trophy under the old rules from the 1968–69 to 2008–09 seasons:
 Real Madrid, after their sixth title in 1966.
 Ajax, after their third consecutive title in 1973.
 Bayern Munich, after their third consecutive title in 1976.
 Milan, after their fifth title in 1994.
 Liverpool, after their fifth title in 2005.

Multiple-winner badge

The "multiple-winner badge", sometimes called "badge of honour", was introduced for the start of the 2000–01 competition for clubs that kept the trophy permanently. The badge itself adorns the left sleeve of the team's shirt during Champions League matches. The original badge was a blue oval on which was an outline of the current trophy in white, overlaid with part of the Champions League starball logo. Above the trophy was the total number of titles held by the club. At the start of 2012–13 competition, the badge became grey with a new design, which was used until the end of 2020–21 season. 

Starting with 2021–22, UEFA abolished the badge's use on the left sleeve, allowing for sleeve sponsors, and incorporated the badge into the regular "Starball Badge" for the clubs who normally wear the multiple-winner badge, with the number of victories placed on top of the middle star. Additionally, title holders with three consecutive or five overall wins have their number of victories etched onto the title-holder logo, with the starball scrapped. 

Because the current trophy permanently remains UEFA property, it is no longer given to a team that wins a fifth overall or third consecutive title. However, the multiple-winner badge is still awarded to such clubs. Liverpool therefore became the last team to be permanently awarded the trophy.

Six teams have won five overall or three consecutive titles, and thus can wear the multiple-winner badge:

 Real Madrid (3 consecutive, 14 overall)
 Milan (7 overall)
 Bayern Munich (3 consecutive, 6 overall)
 Liverpool (6 overall)
 Barcelona (5 overall)
 Ajax (3 consecutive, 4 overall)

Title-holder logo
A separate "title-holder logo" is worn by the reigning Champions League champions in the following season's competition in place of the regular patch worn by the other competing teams. The logo is predominantly dark blue and was introduced in 2004–05, with Porto as the defending champions. The distinction between the title-holder logo and the badge of honour can be compared to the distinction between the Scudetto ("shield") worn by the reigning Serie A champions in Italy, and the stella ("star") worn by teams with over ten Serie A titles in total. However, whereas Juventus wear three stars as they have won over thirty titles, there is no provision for multiple UEFA badges of honour, as the count within the badge can be incremented indefinitely. From 2006–07 to 2010–11, the title holders also played with the match ball used in their triumphant final in their home matches, but from 2011–12, the title holders use the same match ball as the 31 other teams.

The original design for the title-holder badge featured two of the interconnecting stars of the competition's star ball logo at the top, with the caption "champions" and the season of triumph in the centre of the badge. It was slightly modified in 2008–09 to feature the entirety of the star ball logo, albeit with the other stars faded out, and it was drastically changed for the 2009–10 competition. Without the star ball background, it instead featured a design of the trophy which was used for the branding of the previous season's final. 

It was revamped again in 2010–11 to feature part of the star ball on show below the "champions" caption and the year of triumph. A replaced design was first worn by Chelsea in 2012–13; it featured an outline design of the trophy along with the year of triumph, the same design was kept from 2015–16 for the logo, but the material used on the logo was changed. Starting with the 2021–22 competition, reigning champions wear a new logo, which still keeps the same design, but is grey and no longer keeps the championship year in it. In case the title holder also wears a multiple-winner badge, the number of victories is incorporated in the logo which is used in place of the starball.

Winners

Original trophy
 Real Madrid (6) – 1956, 1957, 1958, 1959, 1960, 1966
 Benfica (2) – 1961, 1962
 Internazionale (2) – 1964, 1965
 Milan (1) – 1963

Redesigned trophy

 Real Madrid (8) – 1998, 2000, 2002, 2014, 2016, 2017, 2018, 2022
 Milan (6) – 1969, 1989, 1990, 1994, 2003, 2007
 Bayern Munich (6) – 1974, 1975, 1976, 2001, 2013, 2020
 Liverpool (6) – 1977, 1978, 1981, 1984, 2005, 2019
 Barcelona (5) –  1992, 2006, 2009, 2011, 2015
 Ajax (4) – 1971, 1972, 1973, 1995
 Manchester United (3) – 1968, 1999, 2008
 Nottingham Forest (2) – 1979, 1980
 Juventus (2) –  1985, 1996
 Porto (2) – 1987, 2004
 Chelsea (2) – 2012, 2021
 Celtic (1) – 1967
 Feyenoord (1) – 1970 
 Aston Villa (1) – 1982
 Hamburger SV (1) – 1983
 Steaua București (1) – 1986
 PSV Eindhoven (1) – 1988
 Red Star Belgrade (1) – 1991
 Marseille (1) – 1993
 Borussia Dortmund (1) – 1997
 Internazionale (1) – 2010

References

External links

The trophy on UEFA.com website

 
UEFA Champions League
UEFA trophies and awards
European football trophies and awards